Air Marshal Balakrishnan Suresh PVSM, AVSM, VM, ADC is a retired officer of the Indian Air Force. He served as Air Officer Commanding in Chief (AOC-in-C), Western Air Command from 1 November 2019 following superannuation of Air Marshal Raghunath Nambiar, till the day of his retirement on 31 July 2020.

Early life and education
Air Mshl Suresh is an alumnus of the Rashtriya Indian Military College in Dehradun, National Defence Academy in Khadakwasla, Pune and the Defence Services Staff College in Wellington. He is a graduate of the Tactics and Air Combat Development Establishment, and a post-graduate from Cranfield University in Shrivenham, United Kingdom.

Career
Air Mshl Suresh was commissioned as a fighter pilot in the Indian Air Force on 13 December 1980. He commanded No. 2 Squadron 'The Winged Arrows' as a Wing Commander and Tactics and Air Combat Development Establishment (TACDE) as a Group Captain. Suresh also commanded a strategic fighter base as an Air Commodore.

Air Mshl Suresh has held other positions including joint director and director for air staff inspection, Director Operations (Joint Planning), directing staff and commandant of TACDE, air assistant to the Chief of the Air Staff, Assistant Chief of the Air Staff Operations (Air Defence), senior air staff officer at the Western Air Command and Air Officer-in-Chief Personnel at Air Headquarters.

He served as Air Officer Commanding in Chief, Southern Air Command from 1 August 2018 taking over from Rakesh Kumar Singh Bhadauria, till 30 October 2019.

Awards and medals

Air Mshl Suresh was awarded Vayu Sena Medal in 2001 and Ati Vishisht Seva Medal as a Group Captain in 2005. He is probably one of youngest officers to be awarded the presidential award of AVSM as a Group Captain. He was awarded Param Vishisht Seva Medal in 2019. He was appointed as Aide-de-camp of the president on 1 February 2019.

Personal life 
Air Mshl Suresh is married to Radha Suresh and they have a son and a daughter.

References 

Recipients of the Ati Vishisht Seva Medal
Recipients of the Vayu Sena Medal
Indian Air Force air marshals
National Defence Academy (India) alumni
Year of birth missing (living people)
People from Thiruvananthapuram

Living people
Defence Services Staff College alumni